L'Amoreaux Collegiate Institute (Or L'Am for short) is a public high school in Toronto, Ontario, Canada. It is located in the L'Amoreaux neighbourhood of the former suburb of Scarborough. Originally part of the Scarborough Board of Education, it is now consolidated into the Toronto District School Board. Founded in 1973, L'Amoreaux has an extended French program, and over three quarters of the students do not use English as their primary language. L'Amoreaux is attended by about 584 students. The motto of the school is "Freedom with Responsibility". The principal is Patrick Lee and the vice principal is Gopal Devanabanda.

History
The origins of L'Amoreaux Collegiate could date back to 1868 when S.S. No. 1 opened what later became L'Amoreaux Public School. Located in the northwestern L'Amoreaux neighbourhood, S.S. No. 1 was located on the northeastern corner of Finch and Birchmount until it was demolished in 1970 to eliminate intersection jog. The date stone is now in the foyer of Silver Springs Public School.

The collegiate itself, designed by the noted Canadian architect Raymond Moriyama, was constructed in 1971 and opened on 4 September 1973 on Bridletowne Circle, just northeast of Warden and Finch, as Scarborough's sixteenth collegiate and twenty-first high school. Distinctive in interior design, it has a large tiered Central Market Square named after Rollit J Goldring, the first principal of the school instead of the standard auditoriums of similar sized facilities that had tended to be largely unused. The school hallway appeared in the rock band Rush's 1982 video for the single "Subdivisions".

Overview

Campus

It is a 2-story school with classrooms on the lower floor and the main office in the second. There are around 24 classrooms, six science labs, three art rooms, three music rooms, five computer laboratories (including a communications technology laboratory), four vocational shops for technical design and construction, the Rollit J. Goldring Market Square, a cafetorium with a stage, four gymnasia with the larger one having the ability to be portioned into two with the smaller gyms built in between, a 25m swimming pool shared with the city, main and guidance offices located in the second floor, and the 400m standard race track and football/soccer field. there are two small portables and one large portapak (Adult ESL Center). With its design, the school hallways have accent colors of red, yellow, green and blue moving from the front of the school to the back, and the locker colours are red, yellow, green, teal and blue.

Houses 
From the 2017-2018 school year, students are in one of four houses selected randomly at the start of the year: Incendium, Pelagus, Telluris and Zephyrus (Latin for the four elements). Siblings are grouped in the same house to avoid any rivalry.

Courses 
SHSM (Specialist High Skills Major) Programs
L'Amoreaux is one of the schools in the TDSB, which offers three Specialist High Skills Major (SHSM) programs, and offers programs in Business and Finance, Information and Communication Technology, as well as Health and Wellness. Students enrolled in SHSM receive an extra seal with their diploma.

Extended French and Spanish
L'Amoreaux offers the Honors Extended French Programs, in which students on the Extended French track can graduate with a bilingual certificate. Spanish is also offered.

Robotics engineering 
L'Amoreaux is one of the few schools that offers a robotics course as well as the club. Students in the course learn about engineering and the engineering process, robot systems and programming, and robots in society. Robotics engineering is a project-based course and assignments include building two VEX EDR Robots, which are entered into the worldwide VEX Robotics Competition. Students in the course also help build the FIRST Robotics Competition robot.

Extra-curricular
Sports
 Basketball (boys)
 Basketball (girls)
 Cricket (mixed) (L'Amoreaux has a cricket team)
 Cross country (mixed)
 Dragon Boat (mixed)
 Field hockey (girls)
 Soccer (boys)
 Soccer (girls)
 Swimming (mixed)
 Volleyball (boys)
 Volleyball (girls)
 Badminton  (girls)

Clubs
 Student Activity Council
 Athletic Council
 Formal Committee
 Christian Fellowship
 Debate Club
 Equity and Student Advocacy
 Drama 
 Chess Club
 LESS
 Model United Nations
 Muslim Student Association
 Music Council
 L'Amoreaux Prefects (formerly PALS)
 Radio L'Am
 Yearbook
 Robotics
 Girl Talk
 Boyz to Men
 L'Amoreaux Pride LGBT+
 School Action Team 
 United Cultures @ L'Am
 Black Student Alliance

Notable alumni
Ellen Wong - actress
Tracy Lamourie - activist, celebrity publicist 
Maestro - hip hop artist and producer

See also

List of high schools in Ontario

References

External links
 L'Amoreaux Collegiate Institute
 TDSB profile

Educational institutions established in 1973
1973 establishments in Ontario
High schools in Toronto
Schools in the TDSB
Raymond Moriyama buildings
School buildings completed in 1973
Education in Scarborough, Toronto